The Guaranty Building, formerly called the Prudential Building, is an early skyscraper in Buffalo, New York. It was designed by Louis Sullivan and Dankmar Adler and completed in 1896. The building has been declared a National Historic Landmark and is located within the Joseph Ellicott Historic District.

Building context

The building was the idea Buffalonian businessman and entrepreneur Hascal T. Taylor. He planned to construct a speculative office building called "The Taylor Building" in the developing downtown district. The site Taylor chose was strategically located adjacent to the then County and City Municipal building and near a number of institutional structures. The intention was to attract high quality tenants such as lawyers through proximity, desirable amenities, and the captivating design of an avant garde architect like Sullivan. The Guaranty Construction Company was contracted to build. Hascal Taylor unfortunately died as the project was nearing construction, which resulted in the Guaranty's decision to take on the project alone.

The Guaranty Building was not alone among major private building projects in Buffalo at the time. Two blocks away, the Ellicott Square Building was being built to be the largest retail building in the world. This structure, extant today, exhibits an alternate exploration in the possibilities of new commercial urban architecture by Charles B. Atwood and Daniel Burnham.

As Buffalo's downtown rose above Lake Erie, further engineering feats were achieved including securing the future of the city and the built environment. Although earlier attempts had harnessed the power of nearby Niagara Falls, it was just after the Guaranty building was constructed in 1896 that the power was sent to Buffalo, illuminating the city with hydroelectricity.

Buffalo's rise to prominence in the built environment was matched in the political. As the Guaranty building was being drafted, Grover Cleveland was re-elected 22nd president of the United States. A former Erie County Sheriff, Cleveland had quickly risen from mayor of Buffalo, to governor of New York and then the presidency within five years. His platform of reform against entrenched political  machines, bossism, and patronage was desperately needed, especially in major urban centres such as New York and Chicago. Cleveland's fiscal policies had resulted in his loss of the presidency in 1888, but the results of Benjamin Harrison's interim term brought him back to the office in 1892. The panic of 1893 which ultimately destroyed the firm of Adler & Sullivan had not only destroyed Cleveland's first presidential term, but also resulted in Cleveland's return to office and the final commission of Adler & Sullivan in Buffalo.

Design

Like many Chicago School of architecture buildings, the Guaranty building is a U-shaped plan above the lower levels so that each office could have light and fresh air. The internal portion of the "U" faces south. "In order to increase the amount of light to the interior, the stairwell and the light slit facing the inner courtyard were lined with white glazed terra-cotta that was more costly than normal tiles." The elevators and staircases were enclosed not by walls, but metal cages permitting light into the hallways.

Sullivan's design for the building was based on his belief that "form follows function". He and Adler divided the building into four zones: 0) The basement containing the mechanical and utility area; 1) The lower levels which were public areas for street-facing shops, public entrances and lobbies; 2) The office floors with identical office cells clustered around elevator shafts; and, 4) The attic consisting of elevator equipment, utilities and water tanks.

The supporting steel structure of the building was embellished with terra cotta blocks. Different styles of block delineated the three visible zones of the building. Writing in his Kindergarten Chats, Sullivan said that a tall building "must be every inch a proud and soaring thing, rising in sheer exultation that from bottom to top it is a unit without a single dissenting line."

Ornamentation

Although Sullivan told his fellow architects that "we should refrain entirely from the use of ornament for a period of years," he paradoxically gave the Guaranty building a rich program of floral terracotta ornament. Tom Beeby described Sullivan as the "high-priest of controlled natural ornament."

Sullivan's ornament, unmistakably original, is the subject of much scholarship. Vincent Scully analyzed the ornament of the Guaranty Building and found "a physical drama of compression, tension, and vertical continuity is made physically manifest to the observer." Likewise, William J.R. Curtis wrote that the Guaranty expressed "the idea of a tall building as a living organism, whose weight, pressure, tension and resistance might be experienced through empathy in a direct, almost physical way."

Paul Edward Sprague found that the Guaranty Building indicated Sullivan's evolution as an artist: "From 1885 through 1889 Sullivan's ornament lost much of its former angularity and became more sophisticated and luxuriant." He also argued Sullivan's ornament was influenced by that of Frank Furness.

The Guaranty Building and Sullivan's preceding Wainwright Building share many traits: Simplicity of form, plan similarity, and richness of detail. Yet the Guaranty is said to be a radical departure from the Wainwright because the expression "of the underlying steel-frame construction behind the red terra-cotta tiles is more apparent here than in the Wainwright." Similarly, David Van Zanten found the Wainwright Building's ornament performed a "traditional, even if exceptionally conspicuous, role in its design" compared to the Guaranty.

Reception

The Guaranty Building received strong critical reception upon opening. The critic Barr Ferree in 1895 opined, "though possibly the most richly decorated commercial building in America, the skill of the artist has produced a design of structural sobriety with great richness of effect. This unity of structure and aesthetics 'has been attained' he diagnosed, 'by the long unbroken vertical lines of the superstructure.' Montgomery Schuyler knew of 'no steel-framed building in which the metallic construction is more palpably felt through the envelope of baked clay.'"

Decline and restoration

As was true of many older office buildings, the Guaranty Building was "modernized" during the mid-20th century. Fluorescent lighting, wood paneling and a dropped ceiling were installed in the historic lobby. The exterior storefronts were sheathed in Fiberglass. A fire occurred in 1974, and by that time the building was dilapidated and threatened with demolition.

Efforts to save the building, including the support of Senator Daniel Patrick Moynihan, were secured for its restoration. This restoration, in the early 1980s, was undertaken by architects CannonDesign. Funding came in part from the federal preservation tax credit program.

In 2002, the building was purchased by law firm Hodgson Russ. In 2008, after a further rehabilitation, it became the firm's headquarters.

The building underwent a further series of restorations in the mid-to-late 2000s. The restoration, which totalled $15.6 million, was designed by Gensler Architects of Washington, D.C; M/E Engineering of Buffalo; and Flynn Battaglia Architects of Buffalo.

Landmark status

The building was declared a National Historic Landmark in 1975.

See also
List of tallest buildings in Buffalo

References

External links

 "Guaranty Building & Interpretive Center" from the Buffalo Niagara Convention & Visitors Bureau website
 "Guaranty / Prudential Building" at "Buffalo As An Architectural Museum" website
 

Historic American Buildings Survey in New York (state)
Commercial buildings on the National Register of Historic Places in New York (state)
Louis Sullivan buildings
Chicago school architecture in New York (state)
National Historic Landmarks in New York (state)
Architecture of Buffalo, New York
Skyscraper office buildings in Buffalo, New York
Tourist attractions in Buffalo, New York
Office buildings completed in 1896
Prudential Financial buildings
National Register of Historic Places in Buffalo, New York
1896 establishments in New York (state)